The Mighty Don't Kneel (TMDK) are a professional wrestling stable which currently wrestles for New Japan Pro-Wrestling (NJPW). The stable consists of Mikey Nicholls, Shane Haste Bad Dude Tito, Zack Sabre Jr. and Kosei Fujita. Sabre Jr. is the current and inaugural NJPW World Television Champion. The stable was primarily known as a tag team in Pro Wrestling Noah, with Nicholls and Haste being two-time GHC Tag Team Champions. They also worked for Ring of Honor (ROH), Total Nonstop Action Wrestling (TNA) and WWE (where they were named TM-61 and The Mighty in NXT).

Though best known as a tag team, TMDK has also been a stable, which included, in addition to Nicholls and Haste, fellow Australians Elliot Sexton, Jonah (formerly Jonah Rock), Marcus Pitt, Damian Slater, Mikey Broderick and Slex. TMDK has also been said to stand for "Torture, Murder, Destroy, Kill".

While in 2016, Nicholls and Veryzer signed with WWE and were assigned to its developmental territory NXT, the stable kept working on the independent circuit as TMDK until 2019. Nicholls and Veryzer were renamed Nick Miller and Shane Thorne, while their tag team was renamed TM-61 and later, The Mighty. However, the team would disband in 2018 following Nicholls' release.

History

Formation (2010–2011) 
In the autumn of 2010, Australian wrestlers Mikey Nicholls and Shane Haste passed a tryout held by Pro Wrestling Noah and World League Wrestling (WLW) in the United States, which allowed them to begin training at Noah's dojo. They made their debut for the Japanese promotion on 23 February 2011, and began working together under the team name "TMDK". The Mighty Don't Kneel originated in the Explosive Pro Wrestling (EPW) promotion, where it was a stable, also including Elliot Sexton, Jonah Rock, Marcius Pitt and Slex. Rock and Slex have also represented TMDK in Noah. Nicholls and Haste then began working regularly for Noah in the promotion's junior heavyweight tag team division, though it was questioned whether the two actually were under the  weight limit.

Pro Wrestling Noah (2011–2016) 
On 15 December 2011, Nicholls and Haste received their first shot at the GHC Junior Heavyweight Tag Team Championship, but were defeated by the defending champions, Atsushi Aoki and Kotaro Suzuki. Shortly afterwards, Nicholls and Haste left the junior heavyweight division.

Back in Noah, Nicholls and Haste also began breaking out in singles action, taking part in the 2012 Global League, where Nicholls wrestled KENTA to a draw and defeated Go Shiozaki, while Haste was victorious over Akitoshi Saito and Naomichi Marufuji. In April 2013, Nicholls and Haste took part in their first Global Tag League. Though failing to advance to the finals, they picked up a win over the reigning GHC Tag Team Champions, New Japan Pro-Wrestling representatives Takashi Iizuka and Toru Yano. This led to a title match between the two teams on 12 May, where Iizuka and Yano retained their title. Earlier that day, Noah had announced that Nicholls and Haste had signed contracts to become officially affiliated with the promotion. A rubber match between Nicholls and Haste and Iizuka and Yano took place on 7 July and saw TMDK emerge victorious and become the new GHC Tag Team Champions. In September, Nicholls and Haste both began chasing the GHC Heavyweight Championship, but were defeated in back-to-back title matches by the defending champion, KENTA. On 10 December, the Tokyo Sports magazine named Nicholls and Haste the 2013 tag team of the year, with the two becoming the first gaijin team to win the "Best Tag Team Award" since Stan Hansen and Vader in 1998. On 25 January 2014, Nicholls and Haste lost the GHC Tag Team Championship to Maybach Taniguchi and GHC Heavyweight Champion Takeshi Morishima.

On 10 January 2015, Nicholls and Haste defeated Dangan Yankies (Masato Tanaka and Takashi Sugiura) to win the GHC Tag Team Championship for the second time. They lost the title to K.E.S. (Davey Boy Smith Jr. and Lance Archer) on 11 February. On 28 December 2015, Noah announced that Nicholls and Haste would leave the promotion following their contracts expiring at the end of the year. On 11 February 2016, Noah announced that Haste and Nicholls would return to the promotion the following month to take part in a five-show-long farewell tour, entitled "Departure to the World". Their final Noah match took place on 10 March and saw them defeat Naomichi Marufuji and Mitsuhiro Kitamiya. In February 2016, it was reported that Nicholls and Haste would join WWE's NXT brand following their Noah farewell tour the following month. WWE confirmed the signings on March 25, 2016.

Independent circuit (2012–2016) 
In early 2012, Nicholls and Haste traveled to the United States, where they worked for several promotions, including Ohio Valley Wrestling (OVW), Ring of Honor (ROH), and Total Nonstop Action Wrestling (TNA). In ROH, they won a one-night tournament to earn a match against the Briscoe Brothers at the Showdown in the Sun pay-per-view.

New Japan Pro-Wrestling (2014–2015) 
On 20 December 2014, Haste and Nicholls made their debut for New Japan Pro-Wrestling (NJPW), when they, along with Naomichi Marufuji, were revealed as Toru Yano's tag team partners at Wrestle Kingdom 9 in Tokyo Dome on 4 January 2015. They would go on to win the match, defeating Suzuki-gun (Davey Boy Smith Jr., Lance Archer, Shelton X Benjamin and Takashi Iizuka).

WWE (2015–2018)
In June 2015, Nicholls and Haste took part in a WWE tryout camp. In February 2016, it was reported that Nicholls and Haste were scheduled to join WWE's NXT brand following their NOAH farewell tour.

On March 25, 2016, WWE confirmed the signings of both Nicholls and Haste. They began training at the WWE Performance Center in April, while working for the promotion's developmental branch NXT. During the May 19 NXT tapings, Haste and Nicholls were renamed Shane Thorne and Nick Miller, respectively, while TMDK was renamed TM-61, where TM is derived from their respective last names (Thorne and Miller) while 61 is from Australia's dialing code (+61). They debuted on the May 25 episode, losing to Johnny Gargano and Tommaso Ciampa.

On the October 7 episode of NXT, Thorne and Miller were announced as participants in the Dusty Rhodes Tag Team Classic. On October 12, they defeated the team of Riddick Moss and Tino Sabbatelli to advance from the first round of the tournament. Thorne next defeated Roderick Strong in a singles match (due to Strong's partner Austin Aries being unable to wrestle through injury), to proceed his team to the semi finals, where they went on to defeat SAnitY, thus setting the final against the Authors of Pain. On November 19 at NXT TakeOver: Toronto, TM-61 lost in the final. On the January 18 episode of NXT, Thorne suffered a serious knee injury due to an attack by The Revival (Scott Dawson and Dash Wilder) after TM-61 had defeated them. He had surgery on January 25, which was expected to put him out of action for seven to nine months. He returned from the injury on September 14.

On the January 3 episode of NXT, the return of TM-61 was announced. During the following weeks, vignettes of TM-61 were shown. They made their in ring return on January 31 episode of NXT, defeating The Ealy Brothers. TM-61 then entered the 2018 Dusty Rhodes Tag Team Classic, being eliminated by the Authors of Pain in the first round. On the May 2 edition of NXT, TM-61 defeated Street Profits (Angelo Dawkins and Montez Ford) with a dirty pin, thus turning the duo heel in the process. The following week, they defeated the team of Heavy Machinery (Otis Dozovic and Tucker Knight) with the same tactics. The team was officially renamed "The Mighty", on the June 6, 2018, episode of NXT. On the July 20 episode of NXT, they were defeated by War Raiders. In July, they started a feud with Street Profits with both teams losing matches to each other. On the September 19 episode of NXT, The Mighty defeated Street Profits.

On December 14, 2018, Miller was removed from the "WWE NXT" section of WWE.com, confirming his release and disbanding the team.

Return to NJPW (2022–present) 
On the March 6, 2022, episode of NJPW Strong, Shane Haste interfered in the tag team match between FinJuice (David Finlay and Juice Robinson) and the pairing of Jonah (formerly Jonah Rock) and Bad Dude Tito. He attacked Robinson while the referee was distracted, allowing Tito to hit a frog splash on Robinson for the win. This saw the reformation of TMDK, with Haste and Jonah tagging together. On the April 3 episode of NJPW Strong, Haste caused a disqualification loss to FinJuice after he struck Robinson with a steel chair. Robinson challenged TMDK and Tito to a Chicago Street Fight at Windy City Riot, alongside a mystery partner. At the event, TMDK and Tito were defeated by FinJuice and their partner, revealed to be Brody King. On May 14, at Capital Collision, Mikey Nicholls was reunited with Haste, leaving CHAOS in the process. TMDK and Bad Dude Tito defeated the United Empire, with Nicholls pinning Kyle Fletcher for the win. After the match, Tito, who had been tagging with Jonah since the start of the year, officially joined TMDK. Haste and Nicholls then entered a tournament to become the inaugural Strong Openweight Tag Team Champions, but were defeated in the semi-final to the pairing of Christopher Daniels and Yuya Uemura.

On June 20, Jonah was announced as being part of G1 Climax 32. He would be accompanied by Tito, with both wrestlers being used in undercard tag team matches throughout the tournament.

Following Jonah’s exit from the group due to his return to WWE, Zack Sabre Jr. officially join the stable after his victory to become NJPW World Television Champion at Wrestle Kingdom 17. During the following New Year Dash!! show on January 5, NJPW confirmed on social media that Kosei Fujita would also join the stable.

Members

Current

Former

Member Timeline

Other media
Miller and Thorne made their video game debut in WWE 2K18 and later appear in WWE 2K19.

Championships and accomplishments 
 Australian Wrestling Alliance
 AWA Heavyweight Championship (1 time) – Rock
 Explosive Professional Wrestling
 EPW Championship (8 times) – Nicholls (2), Haste (1), and Pitt (5)
 EPW Tag Team Championship  (2 times) – Haste and Nicholls (1), and Rock and Pitt (1)
 Melbourne City Wrestling
 MCW Heavyweight Championship (3 times) – Sexton (1), Slex (1) and Rock
MCW Intercommonwealth Championship (3 times) – Slex (2) and Rock (1)
MCW Tag Team Championship (2 times) – Slex and Pitt (1), and Rock and Jackson (1)
New Japan Pro-Wrestling
NJPW World Television Championship (1 time, current) - Sabre Jr. 
 Pro Wrestling Illustrated
 PWI ranked Miller #154 of the top 500 singles wrestlers in the PWI 500 in 2016
 PWI ranked Thorne #147 of the top 500 singles wrestlers in the PWI 500 in 2016
 PWI ranked Jonah #132 of the top 500 singles wrestlers in the PWI 500 in 2022
Pro Wrestling Noah
GHC Tag Team Championship (2 times) – Haste and Nicholls
Tokyo Sports
Best Tag Team Award (2013) – Haste and Nicholls

References

External links
 
 

Ring of Honor teams and stables
Independent promotions teams and stables
Pro Wrestling Noah teams and stables
Professional wrestling in Australia
Australian male professional wrestlers
New Japan Pro-Wrestling teams and stables
WWE NXT teams and stables